Oenoanda or Oinoanda (Hittite: 𒃾𒅀𒉌𒌓𒉿𒀭𒁕 Wiyanawanda) was a Lycian city, in the upper valley of the River Xanthus. It is noted for the philosophical inscription by the Epicurean, Diogenes of Oenoanda. 

The ruins of the city lie on a high isolated site west of the modern village İncealiler in the Fethiye district of Muğla Province, Turkey, which partly overlies the ancient site.

The place name suggests that it was known for viticulture.

History

The early history of the settlement is obscure, in spite of an exploratory survey carried out, with permission of the Turkish authorities, by the British Institute at Ankara (BIAA) in 1974–76. 

The city was known as Wiyanawanda by the Hittites. It means "rich in vines/wine" or "land of the wine". During the Bronze Age it was a part of the Lukka lands which corresponds to Lycia from classical antiquity.

It seems that Oenoanda became a colony of Termessos about 200-190 BC and was also called Termessos Minor (or Termessos i pros Oinoanda).  Oenoanda was the most southerly of the Kibyran Tetrapolis, formed in the 2nd c. BC (Hellenistic Period), with Bubon, Balbura, and Kibyra which was dissolved by L. Licinius Murena in 84 BC, whereupon Oenoanda became part of the Lycian League, as its inscriptions abundantly demonstrate.

Diogenes, a rich and influential citizen of Oenoanda, had a summary of the philosophy of Epicurus carved onto a portico wall of the stoa showing the inhabitants the road to happiness. The inscription is one of the most important sources for the philosophical school of Epicurus and sets out his teachings on physics, epistemology, and ethics.  It was originally about 25,000 words and 80 m long and filled 260 m2 of wall space. The inscription has been assigned on epigraphic grounds to the Hadrianic period, 117–138. The stoa was dismantled in the second half of the third century to extend the defensive wall. 

It was occupied into the Byzantine period when a fortress and churches were built. 

Oenoanda is a titular see of the Roman Catholic Church.

The Site

The site was first noted by Richard Hoskyn and Edward Forbes, in 1841, and published in 1842.  The extensive philosophical inscriptions of Diogenes of Oenoanda were identified later from scattered fragments, apparently from the stoa. 

The city walls are well preserved and stand to 10m in places. The Hellenistic city wall is over 65m long and is a superb example of polygonal masonry with small stones on the interior faces while large ashlars were used for the imposing exterior faces.

Part of an aqueduct can be seen in terms of stone pipe sections from a siphon.

Evidence for an ancient Roman Bridge at Oinoanda surfaced in the 1990s.

Official excavations at the site started only in 1997. New archaeological work was started in 2009 by the Deutsches Archäologisches Institut.

By 2012 over 300 fragments of Diogenes' stoa had been identified, varying in size from a few letters to passages of several sentences covering more than one block.

Remains of a screw wine press were also discovered in a house which could prove that the activity suggested in the place name continued to be practised into the late history of the city.

Notable people
 

Lucius Septimius Flavianus Flavillianus (3rd century AD), Roman army member

References

External links 

Livius.org: Oenoanda

Populated places in ancient Lycia
Ancient Greek archaeological sites in Turkey
Archaeological sites in the Aegean Region
Roman sites in Turkey
Former populated places in Turkey
Geography of Muğla Province
History of Muğla Province
Buildings and structures in Muğla Province
Catholic titular sees in Asia